Jutland was a Canadian beam trawler based out of Liverpool, Nova Scotia. Built in 1918 by the Boehner Bros., she was owned by LaHave Fishing Company.

Disappearance
On March 10, 1920, Jutland left Halifax, Nova Scotia, with a crew of 21 heading to the Western Bank fishing grounds. On the morning of March 11, the Halifax steam trawler Lemberg discovered two dories approximately 160 kilometers (86 nautical miles) southeast of Halifax. Both dories were damaged and full of water. The body of John R. Ellison, a mate of Jutland, was discovered aboard one of the dories. The bodies of the 20 other crew members were never found. Various theories on what happened to Jutland have been examined, from an explosion to a collision.

References

Maritime history of Canada
Fishing vessels
Shipwrecks of the Nova Scotia coast
Shipwrecks in the Atlantic Ocean
Maritime incidents in 1920
Missing ships
Ships lost with all hands
1918 ships